Fyrishov is the largest arena in Uppsala and is Sweden's fourth most visited, specializing in swimming, sports events, meetings and recreation. The facilities includes areas for indoor sports, summer sport and a waterpark with waterslides, 50-metre pool, training pool, relaxation area and an outdoor swimming pool. Fyrishov AB also operates the Gottsundabadet swimming pool with a 25-metre pool, a 10-metre children's pool and gym.

Fyrishov is the home arena for Uppsala Basket in the Swedish basketball league (Swedish Basketligan). It also houses the athletic club, the fencing club Upsala Fäktning, Sweden's oldest judo club Uppsala Judklubb, the volleyball team Uppsala volleyball, the weightlifting club Upsala tyngdlyftningsklubb and Upsala Simsällskap, one of the world's oldest swimming clubs. The sport that draws the most audience is football. Uppsala's two teams in the Swedish Super League, Storvreta IBK and IK Sirius IBK, play at Fyrishov.

Fyrishov is owned by Uppsala Municipality. It is planned to be renovated and rebuilt to a cost of 500 million SEK, developed by White arkitekter.

References

External links
Fyrishov's Official Website

Swimming venues in Sweden
Indoor arenas in Sweden
Buildings and structures in Uppsala
Sport in Uppsala